April Rhapsody is a 2000 TV series written by Wang Hui-ling, based on the romantic life of Xu Zhimo, one of China's most renowned poets in the 20th century.

Virtually all characters in the story are historical, but the plot deviates from history somewhat. After the series' broadcast, historian Liang Congjie blasted the show and denied his mother Lin Huiyin's relationship with Xu was anything other than platonic.

Cast

Main
Huang Lei as Xu Zhimo
Rene Liu as Zhang Youyi (Chang Yu-i), Xu Zhimo's first wife
Zhou Xun as Lin Huiyin, Xu Zhimo's close female friend
Annie Yi as Lu Xiaoman, Xu Zhimo's illicit lover who became his second wife

Supporting
Zhou Zheng as Xu Zhimo's father
Mou Yun as Xu Zhimo's mother
Li Jian as Amah in Xu household
Sun Bin as Shen Shuwei, Xu Zhimo's cousin
Wang Gui'e as Lin Huiyin's mother
Wu Jun as Liang Sicheng, Lin Huiyin's husband
Sihung Lung as Liang Qichao, Liang Sicheng's father
Guo Chunxiang as Liang Sicheng's mother
Ma Yue as Wang Geng, Lu Xiaoman's husband
Wang Ban as Carsun Chang, Zhang Youyi's brother
Tien Peng as Chang Kia-ngau, Zhang Youyi's brother
Li Liansheng as Zhang Youyi's father
Zhao Xiaonan as Zhang Youyi's mother
Feng Lei as Weng Ruiwu, Lu Xiaoman's lover
Shao Wanlin as Lu Xiaoman's father
Gao Fang as Lu Xiaoman's mother
Li Jie as Shen Congwen
Li Hongwei as Jin Yuelin
Ma Jie as Hu Shih

References

External links

2000 Chinese television series debuts
2000 Chinese television series endings
2000 Taiwanese television series debuts
2000 Taiwanese television series endings
Taiwanese television series
Television series based on actual events
Television series set in the 1920s
Television series set in the 1930s
Television shows about writers
Television shows set in China